Syarhey Koshal (born 14 March 1986) is a Belarusian professional footballer.

External links

1986 births
Living people
People from Babruysk
Sportspeople from Mogilev Region
Belarusian footballers
Association football forwards
Belarus international footballers
Belarusian expatriate footballers
Expatriate footballers in Latvia
FC RUOR Minsk players
FC Dinamo-Juni Minsk players
FC Partizan Minsk players
RSK Dižvanagi players
FC Minsk players
FC Belshina Bobruisk players
FC Rudziensk players
FC Krumkachy Minsk players
FC Slavia Mozyr players
FC Molodechno players
FC Slonim-2017 players
FC Dnepr Rogachev players